FBI Girl is a 1951 American film noir crime film about a female FBI employee who becomes involved in government plot involving corruption and murder. The film was directed by William A. Berke, and stars Cesar Romero, George Brent and Audrey Totter. It was made by Lippert Pictures.

Plot
Governor Grisby is politically ambitious, as is ruthless right-hand man Blake and a man on their payroll, Chercourt, an influential lobbyist. There is a problem, though: Grisby is actually a wanted murderer named John Williams.

Fearing that the fingerprints for Williams on file with the FBI will someday be traced back to the governor, Blake coaxes petty crook Paul Craig into having his sister, Natalie, a clerk for the FBI, steal the Williams file. She now knows too much, so Blake arranges for Natalie to be killed in a car crash.

FBI agents Stedman and Donley begin to investigate. Natalie's roommate is Shirley Wayne, another clerk for the FBI. Shirley tells them that when Natalie was visited by brother Paul at lunch, both looked extremely nervous.

Shirley's fiancée happens to be Chercourt. She is asked to go undercover, carrying a walkie-talkie, as Blake and Chercourt are still trying to get their hands on the right file so that the fingerprints can be destroyed. Grisby surrenders when the feds arrive. Blake tries to flee on a speedboat, but is shot down.

Cast
 Cesar Romero as Agent Glen Stedman
 George Brent as Agent Jeff Donley
 Audrey Totter as Shirley Wayne
 Tom Drake as Carl Chercourt
 Raymond Burr as Blake
 Raymond Greenleaf as Governor Owen Grisby  
 Margia Dean as Natalie Craig
 Don Garner as Paul Craig
 Alexander Pope as George Denning  
 Richard Monahan as Donald (as Richard Monohan)
 Tommy Noonan as Television Act (as Tom Noonan)
 Peter Marshall as Television Act (as Pete Marshall)
 Jay Maybe as Doris
 Joi Lansing as Susan Matthews
 Walter Coy as Priest
 Byron Foulger as Morgue Attendant 
 Joel Marston as Alex Nicholson - Bellhop 
 Marie Blake as Landlady
 Fenton Earnshaw as Rand
 O.Z. Whitehead as Chauncey - Undertaker

External links
 
 

1951 films
1951 crime films
1950s English-language films
Film noir
Films based on works by Rupert Hughes
Films directed by William A. Berke
Films set in Washington, D.C.
Lippert Pictures films
American crime films
American black-and-white films
1950s American films